Sæle is a village in the Sogndal Municipality in Vestland county, Norway. The village is located on the northern shore of the Sognefjorden.

Sæle has been the site of the Sæle Church since 1903, when it was moved here from the small, nearby island of Kvamsøy.  The church serves the people of southwestern part of the municipality.

The Sæle Sag lumber factory is located on the shoreline of Sæle.  The company produces doors, windows, railings and stairs, as well as general-use lumber.

See also

 List of villages in Vestland

References

Sogndal
Villages in Vestland